is a Japanese four-panel manga series written and illustrated by Aki Hamaji. It has been serialized in Houbunsha's seinen manga magazine Manga Time Kirara Max since December 2017. Its chapters have been collected in five tankōbon volumes as of November 2022.

An anime television series adaptation produced by CloverWorks aired from October to December 2022. The series has been praised for its writing, comedy, characters, and depiction of social anxiety, with the anime's visual creativity receiving acclaim.

Plot
Extremely anxious and socially awkward Hitori Gotō longs to become a rock musician in spite of her struggles, whilst fulfilling her desires to one day make friends. She is suddenly given a chance to do so after she is taken in by Nijika Ijichi to become a member of her newly formed Kessoku Band.

Characters

Kessoku Band
 is the central band in the series, based in STARRY, a live house in Shimokitazawa. The members' family names are derived from the real-life J-rock band Asian Kung-Fu Generation, with their instrumental roles matching as well (for example, the Yamadas of both bands play bass).
 /  

The protagonist and lead guitarist of Kessoku Band. An extreme introvert who has trouble with most social interactions. Having been inspired by her father, she learned how to play guitar in her first year of middle school, thinking this would help her make friends. Despite becoming incredibly skilled at playing guitar and having a small fanbase online (under the alias "guitarhero"), she still has not been able to make friends as easily until she was dragged into playing with Kessoku Band. Since then, Hitori has gained a few friends and is learning to interact with other people. She is usually seen wearing a pink tracksuit, which she even wears over her school uniform. Her surname comes from Masafumi Gotoh.

The drummer and founder of Kessoku Band. Her older sister, Seika, runs a live house where they often play. Nijika looks up to Seika, since they lost their mother at a young age and their father disappeared. She's very kind, cheerful, friendly and outgoing, and is the one holding the group together and helping Bocchi with her social anxiety the most. Her surname comes from Kiyoshi Ijichi.

The aloof, quiet and mischievous bassist of Kessoku Band with a cool demeanor and an androgynous appearance, to the point she sometimes attracts other girls (including Ikuyo) without intending to. She often spends what allowance she gets from her family on new music equipment, which leaves her with little money for anything else, to the point of eating weeds when she has no money for food. After having a falling out with her last band over creative differences, Ryo was convinced by Nijika to start a new one with her. Her surname comes from Takahiro Yamada.

The vocalist and secondary guitarist of Kessoku Band, who attends the same high school as Hitori. In contrast to Hitori, she is a cheerful, charismatic extrovert who has an active social life, to the point that her extroversion manifests as an overwhelming aura at times. She initially joined Kessoku Band to get closer to Ryo, whom she has a crush on, but fled after lying about her guitar playing skills. With Bocchi's help, she becomes a decent guitar player in her own right, and soon settles on playing secondary guitar and providing the band's main vocals. Her surname comes from Kensuke Kita.

SICK HACK
SICK HACK is a psychedelic rock band based in FOLT, a live house in Shinjuku. The members share their last names with those of the real-life band 88Kasyo Junrei.

The bassist and vocalist of SICK HACK. An alcoholic who spends most of her money on booze, particularly boxes of Onikoroshi brand sake, and calls her bass guitar "Shuten-Dōji EX." She was formerly a classmate of Seika in college. She finds kinship with Hitori after coming from a similarly reclusive childhood. Her surname comes from Margaret Hiroi.

The guitarist of SICK HACK. Her surname comes from Katzuya Shimizu.

The drummer of SICK HACK.

SIDEROS
SIDEROS is a metal band based in FOLT. The members share their last names with those of the real-life band Kinniku Shōjo Tai.

The guitarist and vocalist of SIDEROS. Her surname comes from Kenji Ōtsuki.

The drummer of SIDEROS. Her surname comes from Kōji Hasegawa.

The guitarist of SIDEROS, whose surname comes from Toshiaki Honjō.

The bassist of SIDEROS. Her surname comes from Yūichirō Uchida.

Other music-related characters

Nijika's older sister and the manager of STARRY. Professional, serious and aloof with a soft side, she is described by Nijika as a tsundere.

The unnamed public address system engineer of STARRY. Her intimidating goth style and piercings belie her kind nature.

The manager of FOLT.

A freelance writer who contributes to music information websites.

A manager of Stray Beat, a record label. She is in charge of managing Kessoku Band.

Gotō family 

Hitori's mother.

Hitori's father. Hitori's first guitar was originally his.

Hitori's younger sister.

The family's pet dog, named after Jimi Hendrix.

Production

Manga 
After finishing with her first title in Manga Time Kirara Max (Kirari Books Meisouchuu), which was mainly about young girls dealing with moe things, Aki Hamaji considered doing a manga about bands next, as listening to bands is one of her favorite hobbies. However, she did not have any actual experience being in a band or playing an instrument prior to the making of the series, so she conducted extensive research by doing things like asking an acquaintance more familiar with the indie band scene, listening and reading more about the culture, and visiting places that are prominent to the scene (like the live house SHELTER in Shimokitazawa, which would end up being the model for the live house STARRY).

Being aware of the popularity of K-On!, also a Houbunsha-published series with a band setting, Hamaji intentionally set the story around a live house instead of mainly in school to differentiate it. She also admitted using Beck as a reference in making the series as well.

Most of the chapter covers have references to the music videos of Japanese rock bands; most of them would be songs that she liked to listen to, while some others were instead relevant to their respective chapter stories. She also avoided using onomatopoeia or creating lyrics for any of the performance scenes, leaving the finer details of the band’s performance to readers' imaginations, although some of the songs do have names originally mentioned in the manga. While the manga is mostly in a four-panel format, in serious moments she intended to have it follow a conventional manga format as well.

In an interview published shortly after the anime finished airing, Hamaji revealed that the designs of most of her characters in the series were purposely done in a simple way; commenting about Bocchi's design specifically, she said she intentionally created a character who doesn’t have any fashion sense, and her pink hair color may have been inspired by Kaoruko Moeta from Comic Girls (also a Kirara Max series), although pink-haired characters are common in Kirara titles. She also said that she decided on the color of Bocchi's guitar to be black because of how it made a good balance with the color scheme of her design, but chose a Gibson Les Paul as the exact model of her first guitar because it was the first result when searching for a guitar with that specific color on the internet. She also admitted that Bocchi's personality is a projection of hers and that she relates with Bocchi the most among all characters.

Anime adaptation 

Prior to the greenlighting of Bocchi the Rock!s anime adaptation, character designer and chief animation director Kerorira was a fan of the manga for its comedy, art style, and characters, and in particular Hitori's "unhinged" nature. While meeting with animation producer Shouta Umehara at an illustrator exhibition, Kerorira brought up Bocchi in conversation and expressed a desire to work on an anime adaptation of the series. As it so happened, Aniplex had just recently proposed such a project to CloverWorks, as Umehara learned when he inquired to his superior, Yuichi Fukishima, about the possibility. Kerorira joined the project (becoming the first to do so) as its character designer after expressing his enthusiasm for the series and presenting his drawings of the characters. In addition to the character designs and animation supervision, Kerorira also contributed a significant amount of key animation to the project (estimated by Umehara to amount to somewhere between 500 and 600 cuts of animation, around two episodes' equivalent), which he stated was done in order to provide the other animators with an understanding of the "platonic ideal" of the anime's production value. Kerorira felt that providing such a baseline as the chief animation director would allow for smoother collaboration, as it would lead to a creatively unified end product while allowing the animation staff to incorporate their own individual expression, and limit the amount of corrections that would need to be made after the fact. 

Series director Keiichiro Saitō came to work on the anime adaptation of Bocchi the Rock! after Kerorira recommended him to animation producer Shouta Umehara. As Umehara was familiar with Saitō's work having served as an episode director for The Idolmaster SideM, he considered Saitō to be an ideal choice, and Saitō joined the project as director a few days later after discussions with Umehara and Kerorira. Erika Yoshida, the screenwriter in charge of series composition, was recommended on referral from a colleague of Umehara's at Aniplex, who had previously collaborated with Yoshida on Love Me, Love Me Not. As he was aware of Bocchi's similarity in premise and genre to K-On!, Umehara spoke to Kerorira asking him what unique qualities Bocchi had which would distinguish it from K-On!, and worked to help ensure that capturing those aspects of the series was a priority of the production.

In reading the manga prior to production, Saitō was attracted to the relationships between Bocchi and the supporting cast, which were not as intimate as relationships depicted in similar works and gave Saitō the impression that "they respect each other’s individuality and personal space." He found this quality of the story to be both personally relatable and distinctive. Saitō also liked the ways in which Hitori's expressions were often exaggerated to perceptibly disturbing extents in contravention of moe conventions. This aspect of Hitori's characterization was expanded upon in the anime, as Saitō believed that "girls who are flawlessly beautiful aren’t as cute as girls who are a little mysterious or sometimes make weird faces." Kerorira additionally said that Hitori's withdrawn nature made it more difficult to depict her emotions visually compared to those of the other characters. As such, her basic facial expressions were limited, while the animation relied on the more "slapstick" scenes of exaggeration to depict her emotions. Although consideration was taken to ensure Hitori was consistently cute, even when the animation was exaggerating her facial features, the comedy of such exaggeration was generally prioritized.

In adapting Bocchi the Rock! from its original 4-koma format, Saitō and Yoshida introduced numerous substantial differences from the source material, such as rearranging events and altering some jokes in order to aid the anime version's pacing and surreal presentation. Saitō and Yoshida added more of a surrealist bent to the anime as they wanted to prioritize comedy and emotion over a wholly realistic depiction, and felt that the choice of cutaway gags to the anime allowed them to better convey the story while ensuring that every episode had a clear focus. In integrating these cutaways into the anime, Saitō chose to contrast main character Hitori's thoughts during her instances of introspection and "strange" behavior with the external reactions to and conversations about Hitori among the supporting cast. This was done both for storytelling considerations such as the direction and pacing of certain scenes, and also to present Hitori more empathetically by showing that the supporting cast did not regard her as pathetically as she would be wont to believe. Saitō said that whether or not a conversation between the supporting cast occurring during these moments needed to be depicted in detail or not was one of the most difficult aspects of the production.

In order to create the live concert scenes of the anime, the production team recorded physical actors playing the concerts. The recording was then adapted into a computer-generated previsualization so that the animators could establish their preferred shot direction for the scenes using a virtual camera system. The previsualization was then used as the basis for the final animation. In order to ensure that the characters were portrayed accurately in these scenes, the actors were given information about the characters and advised on how to convincingly physically act as them. The music production team at Aniplex were consulted by Saitō to ensure that the ambient noise in the concert scenes was accurate to reality, although it was sometimes omitted when Saitō deemed that it would detract from an important dramatic scene.

Media

Manga
Bocchi the Rock! is written and illustrated by Aki Hamaji. It was initially serialized on Houbunsha's Manga Time Kirara Max magazine on December 19, 2017, as a guest work. A full serialization started in the same magazine on March 19, 2018. It has been collected into five tankōbon volumes as of November 26, 2022. A spinoff anthology comic is also being released, starting with a first volume on October 10, 2022.

Anime
An anime television series adaptation was announced on February 18, 2021. It was produced by CloverWorks and directed by Keiichirō Saitō, with Yūsuke Yamamoto serving as assistant director, Erika Yoshida writing the series' scripts, Kerorira designing the characters, and Tomoki Kikuya composing the music. The series aired from October 9 to December 25, 2022, on Tokyo MX and other networks. Kessoku Band performed the opening theme , as well as the ending theme "Distortion!!". Crunchyroll licensed the series outside of Asia. Plus Media Networks Asia licensed the series in Southeast Asia and released it on Aniplus Asia and Bilibili. Several web series featuring the voice cast were also produced alongside the anime as cross-promotion.

Many of the anime's episode titles come from songs by rock band Asian Kung-Fu Generation, such as "After Dark" and "Korogaru Iwa, Kimi ni Asa ga Furu", with the final episode ending with a Kessoku Band cover of the latter.

Music
The opening theme of the anime series is "Seishun Complex" sung by Ikuyo Kita (Ikumi Hasegawa), and the anime has four ending themes: "Distortion!!" also sung by Ikumi Hasegawa from episodes 1–3, "Karakara" sung by Ryo Yamada (Saku Mizuno) from episodes 4–7, "Nani ga Warui" sung by Nijika Ijichi (Sayumi Suzushiro) from episodes 8–11, and "Korogaru Iwa, Kimi ni Asa ga Furu", a cover of the Asian Kung-Fu Generation song of the same name, sung by Hitori Gotoh (Yoshino Aoyama) in episode 12. The series also had a number of insert songs, including "Guitar to Kodoku to Aoihoshi" in episode 5, "Ano Bando" in episode 8, "Watashi Dake Yuurei" in episode 10, and "Wasurete Yaranai" and "Seiza ni Naretara" in episode 12. Each of these insert songs were also sung by Ikumi Hasegawa, except "Watashi Dake Yuurei", which was sung by Kikuri Hiroi (Sayaka Senbongi).

Most of these songs had a digital single released individually on various streaming platforms on the same day as their anime debuts: "Seishun Complex" and "Distortion!!" on October 9, "Karakara" on October 30, "Guitar to Kodoku to Aoihoshi" on November 6, "Ano Bando" and "Nani ga Warui" on November 27, and "Wasurete Yaranai", "Seiza ni Naretara" and "Korogaru Iwa, Kimi ni Asa ga Furu" on December 25, 2022. A full single of Seishun Complex, including the B side track "Hitoribocchi Tokyo" (played in the teaser video of the series) and instrumental versions of both songs released on October 12, 2022 on digital platforms and in physical stores. However, the song "Watashi Dake Yuurei" will only be released alongside the 5th volume of the anime in Blu-Ray on April 26, 2023.

A full album of songs by Kessoku Band, named Kessoku Band, was also released digitally on December 25 and later physically on December 28, 2022. It contained 14 songs, nine of them originally featured in the anime as opening, ending and insert songs, while the rest were original songs exclusive to the album or not featured in the main series, like "Hitoribocchi Tokyo" and "Flashbacker" (the former was used in the teaser video and the latter was used in a post-premiere PV). The original soundtracks of the anime were released as two volumes, each included in the first two Blu-Ray releases of the anime on December 28, 2022 and January 25, 2023, respectively.

Games
The main characters from this series were added to Manga Time Kirara mobile RPG game Kirara Fantasia shortly after the first anime episode premiered. All characters are voiced by their respective anime voice actresses.

Reception

Critical reception
In Anime News Networks Fall 2022 Preview Guide, the anime received acclaim from most contributors. In general, the anime received praise for its writing, characters, animation, and portrayal of social anxiety. Caitlin Moore praised the realistic depiction of Hitori's guitar playing, as well as the "slightly acerbic" comedy which in her opinion helped avoid the show becoming "too gentle" and contributed to Hitori's relatability. James Beckett similarly complimented the anime's attention to detail regarding the musical activity, in contrast to other similar anime which he felt were generally not attentive to such logistical elements. Nicholas Dupree opined that Hitori's character felt "authentic" to "the kind of introverted kid who would wear band merch and carry their guitar to school in a bid to seem interesting," and was particularly enthusiastic about following the show, saying it was "so laser-targeted at my tastes." Rebecca Silverman's response, in contrast, was middling, as while she agreed that Hitori was relatable, she believed that the anime "seems to conflate introversion and social anxiety," and did not like the visuals. In spite of these criticisms, she called the first episode "engaging." Richard Eisenbeis said that the story had "solid lessons being told" but said that the humor (which he called "cringe comedy") was not to his taste, but acknowledged that others who enjoyed the jokes would find the anime more palatable.

In a review for IGN, Rafael Motamayor strongly praised the anime for its story, themes, and visual creativity, comparing it favorably to K-On! and Keep Your Hands Off Eizouken!. Motamayor also highlighted the similarity in the premise between Bocchi and Komi Can't Communicate, and opined that the former improved on the latter by not "making light of" Hitori's personality for the sake of its humor. The diversity of the anime's visuals and inclusion of CGI and stop motion sequences was also praised.

Accolades
In 2019, the manga series ranked eighth at the 5th Next Manga Awards in the print category.

In the ninth Anime Trending Awards on 26 February 2023, the anime series was crowned as "Anime of the Year" per highest popular votes gained and also won seven more categories such as "Best Original Soundtrack", "Best of Adapted Screenplay", "Comedy Anime of the Year", "Music Anime of the Year" and "Best in Voice Cast". The Episode 8 of the series also won "Best in Episode Directing and Storyboard". The anime won eight awards overall, the most in the awards history so far.

Popularity
The anime was not as highly anticipated by audiences as many more previously established series airing at the same time, such as Chainsaw Man, Mobile Suit Gundam: The Witch from Mercury, Bleach: Thousand-Year Blood War, Spy × Family, and Urusei Yatsura. However as the anime progressed, it gained a larger audience due to clips from the anime going viral online.

The series' sudden growth in popularity following the airing of the anime prompted an unexpected influx of fans who formed an excessive line at mangaka Aki Hamaji's booth at Comiket 101 on December 30, 2022, prompting event organizers to direct Hamaji to a different location. Consequently, Hamaji moved her booth outside of the event hall and published a map directing fans to its new location. Wares at Hamaji's booth were exhausted by 12:51 pm that day.

The manga had also reportedly been sold out in various bookstores both during and after the anime's broadcasting, prompting Houbunsha to announce three rounds of reprints of all of the manga’s volumes, including the Anthology Comic, one month after the final episode aired, with added copies printed for each of those rounds. The magazine the manga is published in, Manga Time Kirara MAX, had also reportedly sold out of its January and February issues on their first days of circulation, helped by the January issue featuring a guitar pick as a bonus to celebrate the anime's airing.

The popularity of the anime also led to skyrocketing demand for musical instruments, especially guitars, where instrument shops recorded a spike of instruments being sold right after the anime ended. Models used specifically by the characters (like the Gibson Les Paul and Yamaha Pacifica guitars used by Bocchi) went out of stock, with no definite restock date. Sales of instruments to beginners also increased (with stocks being depleted in some cases), as many people started to pick up instruments to play due to the series.  

Shimokitazawa, particularly the SHELTER live house that STARRY is based on, also recorded an increase of visitors making pilgrimages to places appearing in the series. However, uneasiness and worries from others, including SHELTER management, resulted after obtrusive behaviour by visitors (which included attempted unpaid viewing of live performances). The official website of the series subsequently issued a reminder to fans to behave properly when visiting such places and support paid performances.

Sales 
Blu-ray and DVD sales reached 14,821 and 1,972 copies respectively in the first week of release of the first volume, and placed second for the most Blu-ray sales that week. The second volume records 16,205 and 588 copies sold respectively for Blu-ray and DVD in the first release week. The third volume records 17,856 Blu-ray and 1,535 DVDs sold on the first week.

The anime's popularity boosted manga sales as well, as the whole series recorded 202,481 copies sold, earning it 12th place for most manga sold on the month of December according to Oricon. Lack of stocks later hampered January sales, but as large reprints replenished stocks in most storebooks, the manga recorded another big sales on February with 193,348 copies of the whole series sold, seventh most for that month. Increase of demands and reprints also surged numbers of circulations of the series, as in January 2023, Houbunsha announced the series marked one million copies in circulation, not including the digital versions, and subsequently hit 2 million copies in circulation in March. 

The album Kessoku Band sold 36,530 copies on release day and subsequently 72,533 copies in the first week, charting first place in Oricon and Billboard Japan for the top album that week and continuing to maintain its performance in the weekly top 10 album sales. It was certified gold by the Recording Industry Association of Japan (RIAJ) after it reached more than 100,000 physical sales in January 2023.

Notes

References

External links
 

2022 anime television series debuts
Anime series based on manga
Aniplex
CloverWorks
Crunchyroll anime
Houbunsha manga
Music in anime and manga
Seinen manga
Tokyo MX original programming
Yonkoma
Comedy anime and manga
Slice of life anime and manga